Angraecum calceolus is a species of orchid.

calceolus